Maximiliano Samuel Romero (born 9 January 1999) is an Argentine professional footballer who plays as a centre forward for Racing, on loan from Eredivisie club PSV.

Club career

Velez Sarsfield
Before making his professional debut, the Argentine forward was close to being transferred to English side Arsenal F.C., for a reported €6 million fee. However, after suffering a knee cruciate ligament injury in a reserves game in 2015 he stayed with Vélez. Again in 2016 Arsenal were rumoured to be interested in Romero, however nothing came of it.

Romero debuted for Vélez at age 17, entering the field in a 0–1 defeat to Sarmiento for the first fixture of the 2016 Argentine Primera División. He also entered the field in the 2–1 victory against Olimpo for the following fixture, in which he scored his first professional goal. He finished his first professional season with 11 appearances (5 as a starter) and 3 goals. During the 2016–17 Argentine Primera División, Romero was mainly a substitute for Mariano Pavone. He managed to score two goals in 19 games (seven starts).

The forward had a successful start to the 2017–18 Argentine Primera División, scoring a double in each of the first two games of the season (3–0 and 2–0 victories against Tigre and Atlético Tucumán, respectively). He also assisted Federico Andrada to score the winning goal in the team's victory against Aldosivi for the round of 32 of the 2016–17 Copa Argentina.

PSV Eindhoven
On 21 December 2017, PSV Eindhoven announced Romero would join the club in the January transfer window. The Dutch team signed Romero for €10.5 million and he signed a -year deal. Romero was officially presented as a PSV player on 16 January and the club confirmed he would wear the number 22 shirt. It was later announced, that the deal only was a six-month loan deal, followed by a permanent contract from the summer of 2018. Romero was part of the PSV squad that won the Dutch Eredivisie in the 2017–18 season. However, due to multiple injuries and the birth of his son, he did not make a single appearance.

Romero made his first PSV appearance on 11 August 2018, coming on as a substitute against Utrecht. His next appearance did not come until 28 November in the Champions League which was again as a substitute, against FC Barcelona. PSV lost the game 2–1 and were eliminated from the competition's group stage.

Loan to Racing
On 25 June 2022, Romero extended his contract with PSV until 30 June 2024 and joined Racing on a season-long loan.

Personal life
On 21 March 2018, Romero's partner Florencia Salazar gave birth to the couple's first child, Benjamín.

Career statistics

Honours 
PSV
KNVB Cup: 2021–22

References

External links
 
 Maximiliano Samuel Romero at Vélez Sarsfield's official website 
 

Living people
1999 births
Argentine footballers
Argentine expatriate footballers
Sportspeople from Buenos Aires Province
Association football forwards
Club Atlético Vélez Sarsfield footballers
PSV Eindhoven players
Jong PSV players
Racing Club de Avellaneda footballers
Argentine Primera División players
Eerste Divisie players
Eredivisie players
Argentine expatriate sportspeople in the Netherlands
Expatriate footballers in the Netherlands